Bill Nace is an American experimental guitarist from New Jersey. Nace has collaborated with Joe McPhee, Steve Gunn, Thurston Moore, Yoko Ono, Okkyung Lee, and Kim Gordon. With Gordon, Nace is part of the experimental electric guitar duo Body/Head.

Discography
 Too Dead for Dreaming (8mm, 2010)
 Both (Drag City, 2020)

With Body/Head
 Coming Apart (Matador, 2013)
 Live Hassle (Feeding Tube, 2016)
 No Waves (Matador, 2016)
 The Switch (Matador, 2018)
 Body/Dilloway/Head (with Aaron Dilloway; Three Lobed Recordings, 2021)

With X.O.4
 All Alien Part One (Open Mouth, 2004)
  X.O.4 (Audiobot 2005)
 Cataracts (Ecstatic Peace!, 2007)
 Lost Signals (Ultra Eczema, 2007)
 Exile (Open Mouth, 2010)

With Paul Flaherty
 Untitled (Ecstatic Peace!, 2008)
 An Airless Field (Ecstatic Peace!, 2010)
 No, the Sun (Open Mouth, 2011)
 Broken Staircase (Wet Paint Music 2011)

As sideman
 Susan Alcorn, Live at Rotunda (Open Mouth, 2019)
 Kim Gordon, Sound for Andy Warhol's KISS (Andy Warhol Museum 2019)
 Chris Corsano, Mystic Beings (Open Mouth, 2018)
 Okkyung Lee, Live at Stone (Open Mouth, 2015)
 Samara Lubelski, Samara Lubelski & Bill Nace (Open Mouth, 2018)
 Samara Lubelski, Live in Belchertown (Open Mouth, 2019)
 Joe McPhee, Last Notes (Open Mouth, 2013)
 Wally Shoup, One End to the Other (Open Mouth, 2015)

References

External links
Bill Nace at Bandcamp

Living people
Guitarists from Philadelphia
American experimental guitarists
Free improvisation
Drag City (record label) artists
20th-century American guitarists
Avant-garde guitarists
Year of birth missing (living people)